HMS Tamar was a Royal Navy troopship built by the Samuda Brothers at Cubitt Town, London, and launched in Britain in 1863. She served as a supply ship from 1897 to 1941, and gave her name to the shore station HMS Tamar in Hong Kong (1897 to 1997).

History
The 1863 incarnation of HMS Tamar was the fourth to bear that name, which is derived from the River Tamar, in Cornwall, and the ship's crest is based on its coat of arms. Built in Cubitt Town in East London, she was launched in June 1863, and began her maiden voyage on 12 January 1864 as a troopship to the Cape and China. On 13 December 1866, Tamar ran aground off Haulbowline, County Cork. Tamar was refloated on 17 December. On 18 October 1869, she ran aground off Paul's Island, Newfoundland Colony. Repairs cost £62. One of her officers was blamed for the grounding.

She originally had two funnels, but she was re-equipped with a more advanced boiler and reduced to one funnel.

In 1874, she formed part of the Naval Brigade that helped to defeat the Ashanti in West Africa, during the Ashanti War. On 7 April 1875, she ran aground whilst departing from Kingstown, County Dublin. She was refloated and resumed her voyage. On 15 April, she ran aground at Chatham, Kent. She was refloated with assistance. On 7 November 1876, Tamar was driven ashore at St. Catherine's Point, Bermuda. She was on a voyage from an English port to Bermuda. Her troops were taken off. She was refloated 12 hours later. Tamar took part in the Zulu War in 1879 and off Egypt in 1882.

In 1879, The British Medical Journal reported a group of sailors aboard Tamar were poisoned by a bad pigeon pie which spawned an Admiralty investigation.

  In 1897 Tamar was hulked as a base ship and relieved HMS Victor Emmanuel as the Hong Kong receiving ship. She was used as a base ship until replaced by the shore station, which was named HMS Tamar, after the ship.

Tamar had been towed out to a buoy on 8 December during the Battle of Hong Kong during World War II. Amidst a curfew of darkness and bombardment by the Imperial Japanese forces, the orders came at 2100 hours on 11 December to scuttle her. She was scuttled at the buoy on 12 December 1941 once it was clear that the advance could not be arrested, to avoid being used by the invading Japanese forces. As the ship's superstructure became airlocked, the ship refused to sink for some time, until the Royal Artillery was called in to administer the coup de grâce.

Over the years, legends state that a mast from the ship was erected outside Murray House in Stanley, and that wood planks salvaged from the ship were turned into the main doors of St. John's Cathedral in the city's Central district. The veracity of both legends, however, has been challenged.

In late 2014, during dredging work for the Central–Wan Chai Bypass, the remains of what strongly appears to be Tamar were discovered at the location of the old Wan Chai Ferry Pier where she is believed to have been scuttled. A government report, completed in September 2015 but released on the government's website in February 2017, finds strong evidence that the remains are those of Tamar.

Notes

References
 

 

Troop ships
Victorian-era naval ships of the United Kingdom
World War II auxiliary ships of the United Kingdom
Troop ships of the Royal Navy
1863 ships
Maritime incidents in December 1866
Maritime incidents in October 1869
Maritime incidents in April 1875
Maritime incidents in November 1876
World War II shipwrecks in the South China Sea
Maritime incidents in December 1941
Ships built in Cubitt Town